Robert Matheson (1881, West River, Nova Scotia – 1958, Princeton, New Jersey) was an American entomologist who specialised in Coleoptera.

He was Professor of Entomology, New York State College of Agriculture, Cornell University.

Works
Partial list
Entomology for introductory courses Comstock Publishing Co. (1944)
Medical Entomology Comstock Publishing Co. (1932)

References
Anonym 1959 [Matheson, R.] Bull. ent. Soc. Amer. 5 51
Mallis, A. 1971 American Entomologists. Rutgers Univ. Press New Brunswick 478-479, Portrait 
Osborn, H. 1937 Fragments of Entomological History Including Some Personal Recollections of Men and Events. Columbus, Ohio, Published by the Author 1 1-394.

American entomologists
Cornell University faculty
People from Annapolis County, Nova Scotia
People from Princeton, New Jersey
1881 births
1958 deaths
20th-century American zoologists
Canadian emigrants to the United States